The Serie B 1939–40 was the eleventh tournament of this competition played in Italy since its creation.

Teams
Brescia, Udinese, Molinella and Catania had been promoted from Serie C, while Livorno and Lucchese had been relegated from Serie A.

Final classification

Results

Footnotes

References and sources
Almanacco Illustrato del Calcio - La Storia 1898-2004, Panini Edizioni, Modena, September 2005

Serie B seasons
2
Italy